Lee Hup Wei (Chinese: 李合偉; born 5 May 1987 in Kajang) is a Malaysian high jumper and Royal Malaysia Navy officer . At the 2019 World Championships held in Doha, Qatar, Lee became the first ever Malaysian track and field athlete to reach the final, where he classified 8th.

Background
He was born in Kajang, in a family of one boy and three girls. He attended secondary education in SMK Dengkil, later he was admitted to Bukit Jalil Sports School to complete his Form 4 and Form 5 studies.Hup Wei also personnel Royal Malaysia Navy

Career
He finished eighth at the 2005 Asian Championships, seventh at the 2006 Asian Games and won the gold medal at the 2007 Asian Championships.

He scored numerous successes in 2007 including emerging the winner at the Asia Track and Field (AFT) championship in Jordan, winning the gold medal at the SEA Games in Korat as well as in the All Comers championship and the Thailand Open. Recently he has also won gold in the Good Luck Beijing Games.

Personal best heights
During the Group B qualifying round at the World Championships in Doha, he improved upon his personal best with a jump of 2.29 meters. His previous personal best was 2.27 meters, achieved at the China Open in May 2008 at Beijing’s National Stadium, also known as the Bird’s Nest, to break the 13-year-old Malaysian record of 2.24m set by Loo Kum Zee in the 1995 Chiang Mai SEA Games.

His efforts saw him win the gold medal, break the Malaysian high jump record, and qualify for the Beijing Olympics.

International competitions

1Representing Asia-Pacific

References

External links

 

1987 births
Living people
Malaysian male high jumpers
Olympic athletes of Malaysia
Athletes (track and field) at the 2008 Summer Olympics
Athletes (track and field) at the 2012 Summer Olympics
Athletes (track and field) at the 2020 Summer Olympics
Athletes (track and field) at the 2006 Asian Games
Athletes (track and field) at the 2010 Asian Games
Athletes (track and field) at the 2018 Asian Games
Malaysian people of Chinese descent
Athletes (track and field) at the 2018 Commonwealth Games
Southeast Asian Games medalists in athletics
Southeast Asian Games gold medalists for Malaysia
Southeast Asian Games silver medalists for Malaysia
Competitors at the 2005 Southeast Asian Games
Competitors at the 2007 Southeast Asian Games
Competitors at the 2009 Southeast Asian Games
Competitors at the 2011 Southeast Asian Games
Competitors at the 2017 Southeast Asian Games
Competitors at the 2019 Southeast Asian Games
Asian Games competitors for Malaysia
Commonwealth Games competitors for Malaysia